Sword of the Yue Maiden, alternatively translated as Yue Maiden's Sword, is a wuxia novelette by Jin Yong (Louis Cha) based on the legend of Yuenü. It was first serialised in January 1970 in the Hong Kong newspaper Ming Pao Evening Supplement. Although this is the last wuxia short work by the author, its historical setting, in the Spring and Autumn period, is chronologically the earliest among Jin Yong's works.

Plot 
The story is set in southern China during the Spring and Autumn period against the backdrop of the conflict between the states of Wu and Yue. A team of Wu swordsmen defeats the best swordsmen in Yue. Fan Li, an adviser to King Goujian of Yue, discovers Aqing, a highly skilled swordswoman, and gets her to defeat the Wu swordsmen.

It is revealed that Aqing learned her skills while playing mock sword duels with a white gibbon. Fan Li engages Aqing to train the Yue soldiers in swordsmanship, and gradually falls in love with her. King Goujian of Yue finally defeats his rival, King Fuchai of Wu, after enduring hardship and humiliation.

Fan Li is reunited with his lover Xi Shi, who had earlier been sent as a concubine to Fuchai. Out of jealousy, Aqing intends to kill Xi Shi upon seeing her. However, when she sees Xi Shi for the first time, she is so taken aback by her beauty and accidentally hurts Xi Shi with her inner energy while thrusting her sword towards Xi Shi, even though the blade did not touch Xi Shi at all. Xi Shi clutches her bosom in pain, and the expression on her face is described as "so beautiful that it will take away the soul of any man who looks upon her". This is the origin of the Chinese phrase "Xi Shi clutching her bosom", which refers to a woman's beauty being enhanced when she is in a state of distress or agony.

Adaptations 
In 1986, Hong Kong's ATV produced a 20-episode television series "The Supersword Lady" based on the novel, starring Moon Lee as Aqing.

See also 
 Yuenü

References 

1970 novels
Novels by Jin Yong
Novels first published in serial form
Works originally published in Ming Pao
Novels set in the Zhou dynasty
Chinese novels adapted into television series
Novels set in Zhejiang
Novels set in Jiangsu